Laura Bilgeri (born 12 July 1995) is an Austrian actress and model known for her supporting role in the 2017 science fiction / horror movie The Recall. She is the daughter of actress Beatrice Bilgeri and musician Reinhold Bilgeri.

Career
Laura Bilgeri was born in Vienna and grew up in Vorarlberg.
After visiting the elementary school Dornbirn- Watzenegg and the Sacré Coeur Riedenburg in Bregenz she went to Munich at the age of 15 to study acting and singing at the Abraxas Musical Academy.

Her film debut was in 2010 in the movie The Breath of Heaven by her father. At 19, she moved to Los Angeles in 2014, where she starred in the role of Sarah a year later for the movie Toby Goes To Camp. In 2016, she starred opposite Wesley Snipes in The Recall, where she played the role of Annie.
In addition to her work as an actress, she also works as a model.

Filmography

Film

Television

References

External links 

 

1995 births
Living people
Actresses from Vienna
Austrian film actresses
Austrian television actresses
20th-century Austrian actresses
21st-century Austrian actresses